New Germany Water Aerodrome  is located adjacent to New Germany, Nova Scotia, Canada and is open from April to November.

References

Registered aerodromes in Nova Scotia
Transport in Lunenburg County, Nova Scotia
Buildings and structures in Lunenburg County, Nova Scotia
Seaplane bases in Nova Scotia